Oppo Reno2 is a line of Android smartphones manufactured by Oppo as the successor to the Oppo Reno series. Launched on 28 August 2019 in India, it comprises the Oppo Reno2, Reno2 F, and Reno2 Z. Like their flagship predecessors, the Reno2 phones feature pop-up selfie cameras to provide edge-to-edge displays.

Specifications

Hardware
The OPPO Reno2 is powered by 2x2.2 GHz octa-core processor with Qualcomm Snapdragon 730G chipset, and has 8GB of RAM and 256GB of storage. It operates on ColorOS 6.1 which is a customized version of Android 9 Pie. The front shark fin pop-up selfie camera is 16MP, and there are 4 rear cameras including a 48MP main camera, 8MP wide angle lens, 13MP telephoto lens, and a 2MP mono lens. The OPPO Reno2 features a 4000mAh battery and is powered by VOOC flash charge 3.0.

Display
The OPPO Reno2 features a  2400x1080 pixel, AMOLED capacitive touchscreen display at 401 ppi, and an aspect ratio of 20:9. The display is covered by a single pane of Corning Gorilla Glass 6.0.

Memory
The OPPO Reno2 has 256GB of built in memory and a dedicated Micro SD slot which supports up to 256GB of additional storage.

Battery
The OPPO Reno2 is equipped with a Non-removable Li-Po 4000 mAh battery. It has VOOC flash charge 3.0, the company claims it can be charged up to 75% in just 30 minutes

Camera
The OPPO Reno2 has a 16MP shark fin style pop-up selfie camera in the front and four cameras on the rear. A 48MP main camera with 1/2.0 senor and f/1.7 aperture, a 13MP telephoto lens with 1/3.4 sensor and f/2.4 aperture, an 8MP wide angle lens with 1/3.2 sensor and a 2MP mono lens The company claims that the OPPO Reno2 has advanced Ultra Steady Video stabilization which can help take clear footage when on the move, it supports telescopic view with 5x hybrid and 20x digital zoom, and it can capture scenes in the night with Ultra Dark Mode.

Software
The OPPO Reno2 is equipped with the ColorOS 6.0.1 which is based on Android 9.0 Pie mobile operating system. Going to get updates of Android 10 and 11 respectively

References

Android (operating system) devices
Mobile phones introduced in 2019
Mobile phones with multiple rear cameras
Mobile phones with 4K video recording
Oppo smartphones
Discontinued smartphones